Moffett may refer to:

 Moffett, Oklahoma, a US town
 Moffett Federal Airfield, Santa Clara County, California
 USS Moffett (DD-362), a US Navy destroyer
 Moffett (surname), people with the surname Moffett

See also
 Moffat (disambiguation)
 Moffatt (disambiguation)
 Moffitt (disambiguation)
 Moffet (disambiguation)